David Arenas Vanegas (born 29 December 1991) is a Colombian chess grandmaster.

He won the Colombian Chess Championship in 2010 and 2015.

As part of the Colombian national chess team, he participated in the 2010 Chess Olympiad.

Arenas received his International Master (IM) title in 2005 and his Grandmaster (GM) title in 2017.

References 

1991 births
Living people
Colombian chess players
Chess grandmasters
Chess Olympiad competitors